The Indianapolis Jewish Film Festival is a  film festival founded by Robert Epstein.
 
The inaugural festival was held from May 3 to May 10, 2014. The second festival was held from April 23 to May 3, 2015.

See also
Indianapolis International Film Festival

References

External links
  Official website

Festivals in Indianapolis
Jewish film festivals in the United States
Film festivals established in 2014
Film festivals in Indiana